Charley Koontz (born August 10, 1987) is an American film and television actor. He is best known for his recurring role as the student nicknamed 'Fat' Neil on Community.

Early life, family  and education
Koontz was raised in the San Francisco Bay Area. He graduated from De La Salle High School in Concord, California, where he appeared in school plays.

He attended Loyola Marymount University in Los Angeles and earned a bachelor's degree in Theater Arts.

Career
Koontz appeared as FBI Agent Daniel Krumitz in CSI: Cyber. The show premiered on CBS on March 4, 2015.

Filmography

References

External links

1987 births
American male film actors
American male television actors
Male actors from the San Francisco Bay Area
Living people
Loyola Marymount University alumni
De La Salle High School (Concord, California) alumni